Landsverk L-62, also known as Landsverk Anti II or a combination of both, Landsverk L-62 Anti II, was a Swedish self-propelled anti-aircraft gun construction that was specifically designed for Finland by Landsverk between 1941 and 1942.

Construction
The vehicle was an improved Landsverk L-62 Anti I where the turret and chassis had been improved for better protection. The chassis was based on the Landsverk L-60 tank but was lengthened with one extra roadwheel per side. The turret was circular and open for a better view against planes. The gun was a 40 mm Bofors L/60 anti-air gun which was already in service with the Finnish military as the 40 ItK/38.

Operational history
In Finnish service the vehicle got the designation ItPsv 41, full name Ilmatorjuntapanssarivaunu 41, meaning Anti-aircraft Tank 41. Finland bought six tanks in 1942. During the battles in the summer of 1944, the Finnish tanks downed eleven Soviet aircraft and thus prevented attacks against the tank brigade. All vehicles survived the war and were used until 1966. Several are part of museum exhibitions in modern times.

Footnotes

Sources
 Stats of the Landsverk L-62 Anti II, aka ItPsv 41

World War II self-propelled anti-aircraft weapons
Tanks of Sweden
40 mm artillery
Military vehicles introduced from 1940 to 1944